Thermotoga hypogea is a hyperthermophilic organism that is a member of the order Thermotogales. It is thermophilic, xylanolytic, glucose-fermenting, strictly anaerobic and rod-shaped. The type strain of T. hypogea is SEBR 7054 (= DSM 11164).

References

Further reading

Salma, Fariha. "Investigation of β-xylosidase, α-L-arabinofuranosidase and acetylesterase from Thermotoga hypogea." (2008).
Dworkin, Martin, and Stanley Falkow, eds. The Prokaryotes: Vol. 7: Proteobacteria: Delta and Epsilon Subclasses. Deeply Rooting Bacteria. Vol. 7. Springer, 2006.

External links

LPSN
Type strain of Thermotoga hypogea at BacDive -  the Bacterial Diversity Metadatabase

Thermotogota
Thermophiles
Bacteria described in 1997